Skovshoved is a former fishing village on the Øresund coast north of Copenhagen, Denmark. The area is part of Charlottenlund postal district and Gentofte Municipality. Local landmarks include Skovshoved Church, Sjovshoved Hotel and the listed Arne Jacobsen-designed Skovshoved Petrol Station from 1938.

History

The first known reference to Skovshoved (Scogshouet) is from 1275. It was originally a small fishing village with just a few houses. An inn, Skovshoved Kro, opened in the village in 1660. In 1620 it obtained status of royal privileged inn, enabling it to brew its own beer.

Skovshoved was known for its fish wives, Skovserkoner, who would carry the day's catch in caskets on their back to the fish market at Gammel Strand in Copenhagen. The first harbor was built in 1869.

In the middle of the 19th century, Skovshoved, like the other fishing villages along the Øresund coast, began to attract summer visitors from Copenhagen. Some visitors stayed at the inn while others rented rooms with the local fishermen. With the opening of the Klampenborg Railway in 1863 and the Coast Line the area became more accessible. The more wealthy summer visitors began to build country houses. Skovshoved Inn was converted into a modern beach hotel by the architects Viggo Klein and Andreas Thejll in 1895.

Skovshoved Parish was disjoined from that of Ordrup in 1915. With the construction of the new Coastal Road in 1936-38, Skovshoved gradually developed into a suburb of Copenhagen. A new and larger harbor was built in 1938.

Landmarks

Much of the old fishing village has survived. Rydhave, now the official residence of the United States' Ambassador to Denmark, is an example of the country houses that were built in the area in the late 19th and early 20th century. It was built in 1885 for E. Schackenborg, the owner of a brickyard. The 22-room Skovshoved Hotel has been listed as one of the world's 50 top hotels by Condé Nast in 2003.

Skovshoved Church is from 1915 and was designed by Alfred Brandt. The listed Skovshoved Petrol Station was completed to a Modernist design by Arne Jacobsen in 1936.

Skovshoved Petrol Station is from 1936 and was designed by Arne Jacobsen. The building is now listed.

In media and culture
 In the 2014–15 DR documentary series I Am the Ambassador, which followed the US ambassador Rufus Gifford, Rydhave featured prominently.

Notable people

 Meyer Herman Bing (1807 - 1883 in Skovshoved) a Danish businessman, a co-founder of Bing & Grøndahl
 Carl Brummer (1864 – 1953 in Skovshoved) an architect, influential in the design of homes
 Julie Fagerholt (born 1968) a Danish fashion designer, grew up in Skovshoved
 Kasper Eistrup (born 1973 in Skovshoved), musician with Kashmir

Sport 
 Kurt Nielsen (1924 in Skovshoved – 1986) a Danish professional footballer and manager, who coached the Danish national football team from 1976 to 1979
 Inge Sørensen (1924 in Skovshoved - 2011) a Danish swimmer, who at age 12 won a bronze medal in 200 meter breaststroke at the 1936 Summer Olympics
 Karen Harup (1924 in Skovshoved – 2009) a Danish swimmer, won a gold and two silver medals at the 1948 Summer Olympics

References

External links

 Skovshoved Hotel

Gentofte Municipality